Sorry for Kung Fu is a 2004 Croatian drama film directed by Ognjen Sviličić. The plot follows a pregnant unmarried woman played by Daria Lorenci, who returns to her village in Croatia after living in Germany during the Croatian War of Independence. Her family labors to find her a husband to avoid a local scandal, not knowing the father is Asian.

Cast
 Daria Lorenci as Mirjana "Mira"
 Filip Radoš as Jozo, Mira's father
 Vera Zima as Kate, Mira'a mother
 Luka Petrušić as Marko, Mira's brother
 Vedran Mlikota as Veliki
 Ivica Bašić as Mate
 Yong Long Dai as Child 
 Jadranka Đokić as Zorica
 Barbara Vicković as Nurse 
 Mate Curic as Krule
 Milivoj Cace as Jović
 Branimir Rakić as Tadija
 Ivan Brkić as Ljubo
 Jolanda Tudor as Mare
 Josip Zovko as Caco

External links
 

2004 films
Croatian drama films
2000s Croatian-language films
2004 drama films
Films directed by Ognjen Sviličić